Eschach may refer to:

Places
 Eschach, Germany

Rivers
 Eschach (Aitrach), a river of Baden-Württemberg and of Bavaria, Germany, headwater of the Aitrach
 Eschach (Neckar), a river of Baden-Württemberg, Germany, tributary of the Neckar